Kanyadaan is a 2002 Indian Assamese-language family drama film directed by Munin Barua.

Story
The story is based on a joint family of a place called Bokulpur. The protagonist of the movie (Jatin Bora) is the youngest son of the family who falls in love with a girl from  a wealthy background of the town. He has three brothers and three sisters in law. The sisters in law knows about his fascination towards the girl but the brothers are not aware of it. It is social movie projecting a simple family of the middle-class background.

Cast
Jatin Bora as Utpal Baruah
Rituparna Kataki as Reema
Arun Nath as Vijoy Baruah
Mridula Baruah as Joya
Jayanta Das as Vinanda Baruah
Madhurima Chaudhury as Neera
Bhaskar Bora as Vinoy Boruah
Purabi Sarma as Rubi
Chetana Das
Hiranya Deka as Phonidhor
Tapan Das as Ronjit Phukan
 Manjula Baruah
 Jagadish Bhuyan
Rashami Desai (cameo)

Soundtrack

The music of Kanyadaan is composed by Zubeen Garg. The album contains 8 total tracks including 6 main tracks and 2 bonus tracks. The track "Uth Gutibo Janene" was reused in Bengali Song as "Gun Gun Gun Gunjare" sung by Shreya Ghoshal and Sagarika in the film Shudhu Tumi.

References

External links
 
Kanyadaan movie in Enajori.com

Assamese-language films
Films set in Assam
Films directed by Munin Barua
2000s Assamese-language films